Clare Joan Haughey (née Donnelly, born April 1967) is a Scottish politician serving as Minister for Children and Young People since 2021, having previously served as Minister for Mental Health from 2018 to 2021. A member of the Scottish National Party (SNP), she has served as a Member of the Scottish Parliament (MSP) for Rutherglen since in the 2016.

Nursing career
Haughey trained as a mental health nurse and worked as a clinical nurse manager. Her family were based in Australia for some years.

Political career
In September 2015 the SNP branch selected her as the candidate for the Rutherglen constituency, ahead of the 2016 Scottish Parliament election. The constituency had been held by Labour since the establishment of the Scottish Parliament in 1999 until the election in May 2016, when Haughey defeated the incumbent James Kelly.

On 27 June 2018, Haughey was appointed as the Scottish Government's Minister for Mental Health.

She retained the Rutherglen seat in the 2021 Scottish Parliament election, with an increased majority and just over 50% of the vote share.

On 19 May 2021, Haughey was appointed to the new government as Minister for Children and Young People.

References

External links 
 
 profile on SNP website
 personal website
 profile on Scottish Government website

1967 births
Living people
People from Rutherglen
Scottish expatriates in Australia
Politicians from South Lanarkshire
Scottish nurses
Scottish National Party MSPs
Ministers of the Scottish Government
Members of the Scottish Parliament 2016–2021
Members of the Scottish Parliament 2021–2026
Female members of the Scottish Parliament